The California 8 Hours is a sports car endurance race for GT3 and GT4 specification cars held at WeatherTech Raceway Laguna Seca in Monterey, California, as part of the Intercontinental GT Challenge. The first annual race was run in 2017. TCR Touring Cars were added to the race in 2018. Over the three editions of the event, it was broadcast in part on television by CBS Sports Network, and streamed live across the internet.

For the first two years, the California 8 Hours served as the season finale of the Intercontinental GT Challenge. In 2019, the date was brought forward to fill the second race of the season. The event was replaced as the US leg of IGTC by the newly created Indianapolis 8 Hours event at Indianapolis Motor Speedway in the 2020 Intercontinental GT Challenge.

Winners

Multiple winners

By driver

By manufacturer

See also
 Intercontinental GT Challenge

References

Motorsport competitions in California